Lurago Marinone is a comune (municipality) in the Province of Como in the Italian region of Lombardy.

Lurago Marinone borders the following municipalities: Appiano Gentile, Carbonate, Fenegrò, Limido Comasco, Mozzate, Veniano.

References

Cities and towns in Lombardy